Henri Morel (13 June 1838, in Claye – 18 May 1912) was a Swiss politician and President of the Swiss National Council (1886/1887).

External links 
 
 

1838 births
1912 deaths
People from Claye-Souilly
Swiss Calvinist and Reformed Christians
Members of the Council of States (Switzerland)
Members of the National Council (Switzerland)
Presidents of the National Council (Switzerland)